The 2013–14 Nemzeti Bajnokság I is the 62nd season of the Nemzeti Bajnokság I, Hungary's premier Handball league.

Team information 

The following 13 clubs compete in the NB I during the 2013–14 season:

Personnel and kits
Following is the list of clubs competing in 2013–14 Nemzeti Bajnokság I, with their manager, captain, kit manufacturer and shirt sponsor.

Regular season

Standings

* : Hungary national junior handball team played only in regular season.

Pld - Played; W - Won; L - Lost; PF - Points for; PA - Points against; Diff - Difference; Pts - Points.

Schedule and results
In the table below the home teams are listed on the left and the away teams along the top.

Top goalscorers

Source:

Championship Playoffs 
Teams in bold won the playoff series. Numbers to the left of each team indicate the team's original playoff seeding. Numbers to the right indicate the score of each playoff game.

Quarter-finals

1st leg

2nd leg

3rd leg

Balatonfüredi KSE won series 2–1 and advanced to Semifinals.

Csurgói KK won series 2–1 and advanced to Semifinals.

Semifinals

1st leg

2nd leg

MKB-MVM Veszprém won series 2–0 and advanced to Final.

Pick Szeged won series 2–0 and advanced to Final.

Final

1st leg

2nd leg

MKB-MVM Veszprém won Championship final series 2–0.

Team roster
1 Nándor Fazekas, 2 Uros Vilovski, 3 Péter Gulyás, 4 Gergő Iváncsik, 5 Timuzsin Schuch, 9 Tamás Iváncsik, 11 Carlos Ruesga, 13 Momir Ilić, 18 Tamás Mocsai, 19 László Nagy, 21 Iman Jamali, 23 Cristian Ugalde, 25 Chema Rodriguez, 30 Mirsad Terzić, 32 Mirko Alilović, 33 Renato Sulić and 35 Živan Pešić

Head coach: Antonio Carlos Ortega

Third Place

Balatonfüredi KSE won series 2–1 and won the Third Place.

5th place

Grundfos-Tatabány KC won series 2–0 and won 5th Place.

Relegation round

Final standings

Pld - Played; W - Won; L - Lost; PF - Points for; PA - Points against; Diff - Difference; Pts - Points.

Results
In the table below the home teams are listed on the left and the away teams along the top.

Final standing

(C) = Champion; (R) = Relegated; (P) = Promoted; (E) = Eliminated; (O) = Play-off winner; (A) = Advances to a further round.

References

External links
 Hungarian Handball Federaration 

Nemzeti Bajnokság I (men's handball)
2013–14 domestic handball leagues
Nemzeti Bajnoksag I Men